Sivappathigaram is a 2006 Indian Tamil-language political action film written and directed by Karu Pazhaniappan. The film stars Vishal, Mamta Mohandas, Manivannan, Rajan P. Dev, Upendra Limaye, Ganja Karuppu and Raghuvaran. The film's score and soundtrack are composed by Vidyasagar. The film's climax was shot during the Annual Azhagar festival in Madurai. Mamta Mohandas made her debut in Tamil with this film. Later on, the film was also dubbed and released in Hindi under the title Aaj Ka Naya Kamina.

Plot
Former IAS officer and Professor Dr. Elango (Raghuvaran) returns to his native village near Theni with his college-going daughter Charulatha (Mamta Mohandas). He has taken voluntary retirement from a college in Chennai and has come to live in his ancestral house. He plans to do research on folk songs and release the collection as a book. His former student Sathyamoorthy (Vishal) visits to assist him in this venture. Charu falls head over heels for Sathya, on keenly observing his intellect, humaneness, and social awareness.

Meanwhile, general elections are announced to the state legislature, and the parties start finalizing the candidates for the constituencies. When the candidates start filing nominations, dreadful things happen. Some candidates from both major parties are murdered, and all the candidates get jittery. A lot of candidates withdraw from the fray fearing death. The parties are in a fix on what to do. The police is on the hunt for the killer. The election commission postpones the elections.

When the police tightens their noose and ties loose ends, the killer is traced. The trail leads to Sathya, and it is found that he is aided in this bloodshed by Elango. The police arrests Elango. At the same time, Charu reveals her mind to Sathya during their travel to Hyderabad. Sathya reveals his undercover deeds.

Three years ago, Satya was a final year management student in Elango's class. Satya's widowed father (Manivannan) also worked in the same college's canteen. When by-elections are announced for Chennai-Central constituency, Satya and his mates, under Elango's guidance, conduct an opinion-poll of the candidates as a field project. They announce the opinion results two days before polling, which said that the opposition's candidate will win. The election give the same result and the ruling party's candidate is angry at losing such an easy chance, and he plans to take revenge with help of the home minister. On the day of Satya's convocation, the police raid the college under the false pretense of looking for drugs. During the fight, Satya's father and around 30 students hide in the canteen. The ruling party candidate leaks cooking gas into the closed room and sets it on fire. All 31 people die, and the management reports it as a freak accident.  These events force Satyamoorthy and Elango to resort to the task of cleansing the society of the current breed of dangerous, inhuman and selfish politicians during elections.

Later, Sathya escapes from the police's net and makes another attempt at the Home Minister in Madurai. Whether he succeeds in his attempts and was able to send out the message correctly to the people forms the rest of the story.

Cast

Soundtrack

The soundtracks and background music has been composed by Vidyasagar.

Critical reception

Rediff.com rated the film 1/5, calling it "super-stupid". Nowrunning.com rated the film 2.5/5, writing "The movie is above average and a little more care on the narration style, the screenplay and the characterizations could have definitely made it a big blockbuster."

References

External links
 

2006 films
Films shot in Madurai
2000s Tamil-language films
Films scored by Vidyasagar
Indian action drama films
Films about corruption in India
Indian vigilante films
Films directed by Karu Pazhaniappan
2006 action drama films
2000s vigilante films